Joseph Leonard Follett (February 16, 1843 – April 1, 1907) was an American soldier who fought in the American Civil War. Follett received the country's highest award for bravery during combat, the Medal of Honor, for his action during the Battle of Island Number Ten in New Madrid, Missouri on 3 March 1862 and the Battle of Stones River in Tennessee on 31 December 1862. He was honored with the award on 19 September 1890.

Biography
Follett was born in Newark, New Jersey on 16 February 1843 to Jacob Follett and Catherine Miller. He married Grace Kilgore and together they had a daughter Belsie Grace Follett 13 Jun 1874.  He joined the 1st Missouri Infantry in April 1861, later re-organized as the 1st Missouri Light Artillery. He died on 1 April 1907 and his remains are interred at the Albany Rural Cemetery in Albany, New York.

Medal of Honor citation

See also

List of American Civil War Medal of Honor recipients: A–F
Chronicling America

References

1843 births
1907 deaths
People of Missouri in the American Civil War
Union Army officers
United States Army Medal of Honor recipients
American Civil War recipients of the Medal of Honor